Enon is a personal assistant robot first offered for sale in September 2005. Enon was developed by two companies: Fujitsu Frontech Limited and Fujitsu Laboratories Ltd. The six-million yen (US$60,000) rolling robot is self-guiding, with limited speech recognition and synthesis. Enon can amongst others be used to provide guidance, transport objects, escort guests and perform security patrolling, according to the organization.

External links
 Fujitsu

References 

Robotics at Fujitsu
Personal assistant robots
Humanoid robots
2005 robots
Rolling robots